Anne Letitia Dickson CBE (born 18 April 1928) is a former Northern Ireland Unionist politician.

Born in London, she moved with her family to Northern Ireland at an early age and was educated at Holywood and Richmond Lodge School. After service as the Chair of the Northern Ireland Advisory Board of the Salvation Army she became actively involved in politics for the Ulster Unionist Party. Elected as chair of the Carrick Division Unionist Association she later became a member of the Newtownabbey Urban District Council; serving as vice-chair of the council from 1967 to 1969.

She was then elected as an Ulster Unionist politician for the Carrick constituency in the Parliament of Northern Ireland at Stormont as a supporter of the prime minister Terence O'Neill. After the dissolution of the Stormont Parliament, she was elected in the 1973 Assembly election for South Antrim as an Independent Unionist candidate having resigned from the UUP in 1972. After the Ulster Unionist party split in 1973/4 over the Sunningdale agreement she joined the newly formed Unionist Party of Northern Ireland (UPNI) along with other supporters of the former Northern Ireland prime minister Brian Faulkner. She retained her seat in South Antrim in the 1975 constitutional convention election. After the retirement of Brian Faulkner she became leader of the Unionist Party of Northern Ireland (UPNI) in 1976, becoming the first woman to lead a major political party in Northern Ireland.
In 1979 she contested the Belfast North constituency in the Westminster election, polling 10% of the vote, the best performance by a UPNI candidate in Northern Ireland, however, her intervention was sufficient to split the moderate Unionist vote resulting in the seat being gained by the DUP. The UPNI disbanded in 1981 after poor results in the local government elections that year and Dickson retired from active politics. Subsequently, she was chair of the Northern Ireland Consumer Council from 1985 to 1990. She was appointed CBE in the 1990 Birthday Honours.

References

1928 births
Living people
Leaders of political parties in Northern Ireland
Commanders of the Order of the British Empire
Councillors in County Antrim
Members of the House of Commons of Northern Ireland 1969–1973
Members of the Northern Ireland Assembly 1973–1974
Members of the Northern Ireland Constitutional Convention
Ulster Unionist Party members of the House of Commons of Northern Ireland
Unionist Party of Northern Ireland politicians
Women members of the House of Commons of Northern Ireland
Members of the House of Commons of Northern Ireland for County Antrim constituencies
Ulster Unionist Party councillors
Women councillors in Northern Ireland